Mauro Cornaz (born 25 March 1960) is a former Italian World Cup alpine ski racer who competed in two editions (1982 and 1985) of the FIS Alpine World Ski Championships.

World Championships results

National titles
Cornaz has won a national title.
Italian Alpine Ski Championships
Downhill: 1984

References

External links
 

1960 births
Living people
Italian male alpine skiers
Italian alpine skiing coaches